{{Automatic taxobox 
| image = Theileria-parva-kinete.jpg
| image_alt = Kinete stage of Theileria parva in the transmitting tick Rhipicephalus appendiculatus
| image_caption = Kinete stage of Theileria parva in the transmitting tick Rhipicephalus appendiculatus| display_parents = 8
| taxon = Theileria
| subdivision_ranks = Species
| subdivision = Theileria annulataTheileria electrophoriTheileria equi Theileria microtiTheileria orientalisTheileria parva}}Theileria is a genus of parasites that belongs to the phylum Apicomplexa, and is closely related to Plasmodium. Two Theileria species, T. annulata and T. parva, are important cattle parasites. T. annulata causes tropical theileriosis and T. parva causes East Coast fever. Theileria species are transmitted by ticks.
The genomes of T. orientalis Shintoku, Theileria equi WA, Theileria annulata Ankara and Theileria parva Muguga have been sequenced and published.Theileria equi is a known cause of equine piroplasmosis.

Vaccines against Theileria are in development. In May 2010, a vaccine that was reported to protect cattle against East Coast fever had been approved and registered by the governments of Kenya, Malawi, and Tanzania.

Description

Species in this genus undergo exoerythrocytic merogony in the lymphocytes, histiocytes, erythroblasts, and other cells of the internal organs. This is followed by invasion of the erythrocytes by the merozoites, which may or may not reproduce. When merogony does occur, no more than four daughter cells are produced. The frequent occurrence of elongated bacillary or "bayonet" forms within the erythrocyte is considered as characteristic of this genus.

The organism is transmitted by various tick species, including Rhipicephalus, Dermacentor, and Haemaphysalis. The organism reproduces in the tick as it progresses through its life stages. Both T. annulata and T. parva induce transformation of infected cells of lymphocyte or macrophage/monocyte lineages. T. orientalis does not induce uncontrolled proliferation of infected leukocytes and instead multiplies predominantly within infected erythrocytes.

Genomics

The genomes of T. orientalis Shintoku, Theileria equi WA, Theileria annulata Ankara and Theileria parva Muguga have been sequenced. Genomic data can be accessed PiroplasmaDB which is part of the Eukaryotic Pathogen Bioinformatic Resource (EuPathDB).

Evolution
The genus is thought to have first appeared in ruminants during the Miocene.  It is named for Gertrud Theiler, daughter of Arnold Theiler.

TransmissionTheileria spp. can be transmitted to cattle through tick bites, including the brown ear tick, a Rhipicephalus sp.

 Important species T. parva is the cause of bovine theileriosis and East Coast fever.T. annulata also is a cause of bovine theileriosis.T. equi causes equine piroplasmosis. It was originally classified as Babesia equi in 1901 by Charles Louis Alphonse Laveran, but was reclassified as T. equi'' in 1998 by Heinz Mehlhorn and Eberhard Schein.

Treatment
Buparvaquone is a promising compound for the therapy and prophylaxis of all forms of theileriosis.

References

External links 
Theileria annulata sequencing project
Theileria parva sequencing project
Tropical theileriosis — Wellcome Trust project
PiroplasmaDB — genomic and functional genomic resource for piroplasmida

Piroplasmida
Apicomplexa genera